Noma is a three-Michelin-star restaurant run by chef René Redzepi, and co-founded by Claus Meyer, in Copenhagen, Denmark. The name is a syllabic abbreviation of the two Danish words "" (Nordic) and "" (food). Opened in 2003, the restaurant is known for its focus on foraging, invention and interpretation of New Nordic Cuisine. In 2010, 2011, 2012, and 2014, it was ranked as the Best Restaurant in the World by Restaurant magazine. In 2021 it won the first spot in the World's 50 Best Restaurants Awards.

History
Noma's original location was at Strandgade 93, in an old warehouse on the waterfront in the Christianshavn neighbourhood in central Copenhagen.

The building is situated by the Greenlandic Trading Square (Danish: Grønlandske Handels Plads), which for 200 years was a centre for trade to and from the Faroe Islands, Finnmark, Iceland, and in particular, Greenland. Dry fish, salted herring, whale oil and skins are among the goods that were stored in and around the warehouse before being sold off to European markets.

In 2003, the warehouse was turned into North Atlantic House, a centre for the art and culture of the North Atlantic region. Noma was opened at the same time by Redzepi and Claus Meyer. The restaurant's interior was designed by Space Copenhagen.

Between 12 and 16 February 2013, 63 of 435 diners became ill after eating at Noma, according to a Danish Food Administration report. The symptoms were attributed to norovirus, which was believed to have been unintentionally spread by an infected kitchen employee.

Redzepi planned to close Noma after 31 December 2016 and reopen it in 2017 as an urban farm near Copenhagen.

Noma reopened on 15 February 2018 after a year hiatus. The restaurant itself also moved from its previous Strandgade location, now housing Restaurant Barr, to its current location at Refshalevej 96.

In May 2020, during the COVID-19 crisis, Noma re-opened as a wine and burger bar, with takeaway options. It is sometimes referred as "Noma 3.0" by the food media. Redzepi plans to keep this open for at least a part of the summer 2020.

In 2021, Noma won first place on the World's Best Restaurant 2021 list.

Noma is expected to close at the end of 2024 and transform into a test kitchen, Noma Projects, for online ordering. The dining rooms will occasionally be open as a pop-up restaurant.

Food

The cuisine of Noma is Nordic/Scandinavian; the restaurant's founders René Redzepi and Claus Meyer have attempted to redefine this Nordic cuisine. Its cuisine can be considered more an interpretation of Nordic food than classical Nordic food itself, according to Meyer in the book Noma – Nordic Cuisine. Famous dishes include 'The Hen and the Egg', a meal cooked by the diners themselves which consists of potato chips, a wild duck egg, slightly wet hay, salt, herbs, wild forest plants, hay oil, thyme, butter, and wild garlic sauce.

Staff
Redzepi formerly worked at restaurants including The French Laundry, elBulli, Kong Hans Kælder and Le Jardin des Sens. The head chef is currently Kenneth Foong, replacing Canadian Benjamin Ing in July 2020. Prior head chefs include Dan Giusti and Matt Orlando. The head sommelier is Ava Mees List.

Temporary locations 
From 28 July to 6 August 2012, Noma decamped to London for a 10-day pop-up restaurant hosted by Claridge's hotel in Mayfair, while the restaurant in Copenhagen was closed from 22 July to 13 August for refurbishment. Redzepi, along with head chef Matt Orlando and staff from the restaurant, served up a £195-per-head nine-course menu that included their versions of scones and clotted cream, Lancashire hotpot with British ingredients, as well as live ants foraged in Denmark and flown to London.

On 29 March 2014, Noma announced that the restaurant would be relocating to Japan for two months at the beginning of 2015.

On 24 July 2015, Noma announced that the restaurant would be relocating to Australia for 10 weeks at the beginning of 2016.

On 12 April 2017, Noma Mexico was opened in Tulum, Quintana Roo, Mexico. Each multi-course dinner costs US$600. Noma partnered with Traspatio Maya, a nonprofit network of 15 Maya communities to provide Yucatecan ingredients such as white Naal Teel corn, Ixil onions, Xtop pepita, bee larva, and Melipona honey from the Calakmul Biosphere Reserve. Products from the rest of the country are also included, such as Baja California wine, Chiapas coffee and Oaxaca artisanal plateware. The pop-up closed on 28 May.

On April 13, 2022 it was announced that a popup Noma would open in Brooklyn, New York operating from May 16 - May 20th of that year.

Awards 
 2006: The World's 50 Best Restaurants, Restaurant – 33rd Best Restaurant in the World
 2007: The World's 50 Best Restaurants, Restaurant – 15th Best Restaurant in the World
 2008: The World's 50 Best Restaurants, Restaurant – 10th Best Restaurant in the World
 2008: TripAdvisor, Best restaurant in the world
 2008: Lo Mejor de la Gastronomia conference (San Sebastián, Spain), International Chef of the Year
 2008–2020: Michelin Guide – two stars
 2009: The World's 50 Best Restaurants, Restaurant – 3rd Best Restaurant in the World
 2009: The World's 50 Best Restaurants, Restaurant – Chefs' Choice
 2010: The World's 50 Best Restaurants, Restaurant – Best Restaurant in the World
 2011: The World's 50 Best Restaurants, Restaurant – Best Restaurant in the World
 2012: The World's 50 Best Restaurants, Restaurant – Best Restaurant in the World
 2013: The World's 50 Best Restaurants, Restaurant – 2nd Best Restaurant in the World
 2014: The World's 50 Best Restaurants, Restaurant – Best Restaurant in the World
 2015: The World's 50 Best Restaurants, Restaurant – 3rd Best Restaurant in the World
 2016: The World's 50 Best Restaurants, Restaurant – 5th Best Restaurant in the World
 2021: The World's 50 Best Restaurants, Restaurant – Best Restaurant in the World
 2021: Michelin Guide – three stars

In 2010, the restaurant, as a relative newcomer, startlingly stole the crown that El Bulli had held for four consecutive years. This came soon after previous first and second place chefs Ferran Adria and Heston Blumenthal announced that they would be temporarily closing their restaurants. At the time, Noma was viewed as the head of a new movement to spread New Nordic cuisine.

In 2011, with El Bulli having withdrawn from the competition because they would be permanently closing, Noma was easily named the Best Restaurant for the second straight year. It was selected by a worldwide panel of journalists, chefs, restaurateurs, and food lovers. The restaurant continued its dominance without having earned a third Michelin Star.

In 2012, Redzepi won the award for Noma yet again, being praised by Restaurant as being "the standard bearer for the New Nordic movement" and winning respect for his attention to detail and innovative approach. His use of local and seasonal ingredients foraged from the seashore and forest was also recognized.

In 2013, Noma was voted the second best restaurant in the world, having lost the first-place position to El Celler de Can Roca in Girona, Catalonia, Spain. In 2014, Noma regained the title.

Other recognition 
The restaurant was featured in Anthony Bourdain: Parts Unknown on 6 October 2013.

Gallery

References

Further reading

External links

 

2004 establishments in Denmark
Christianshavn
Michelin Guide starred restaurants in Denmark
Molecular gastronomy
Restaurants established in 2004
Restaurants in Copenhagen
Companies based in Copenhagen Municipality